The Apostrophe Protection Society is a UK society with "the specific aim of preserving the correct use of this currently much abused punctuation mark". It was founded in 2001 by John Richards, a retired sub-editor, in response to his observations of widespread incorrect use of the apostrophe. The original members of the society were Richards and his son, Stephen. By June 2001, following an article in The Daily Telegraph, there were 257 members. Initially, the society's work focused on the town of Boston, Lincolnshire, where Richards lived. Its first successful correction was getting the local library to write "CDs" instead of "CD's".

The society's website includes many claimed examples of apostrophe "abuse"; it says it is intended to help correct, rather than chide, offenders. Richards said he had a standard, polite letter that explained the basic rules for apostrophe use, which he sent to supporters to forward to offending businesses and other organisations.

One issue that the society intervened in more than once was the tendency of businesses originally named after people not to include apostrophes in their names. In 2006, the society called for apostrophes to be used in the names of Harrods, Selfridges, and Currys. In 2012, Waterstones decided to remove the apostrophe it had used until then, a move to which Richards objected, saying "It's just plain wrong. It's grammatically incorrect. If Sainsbury's and McDonald's can get it right, then why can't Waterstone's?".

Place names and signage also came in for criticism. In 2009, when Birmingham City Council decided to remove apostrophes from all its street signs, the Apostrophe Protection Society objected in strong terms. Richards described the move as "a terrible example", "retrograde", and "utter chaos". In 2013, the society objected to a similar change being made by Mid Devon District Council and the council reversed its decision a week later. Following that apparent success in May, in June Richards backed a campaign begun by "The Apostrophe Vigilante" to have the apostrophe reinstated in the name of Princes Street in Edinburgh, from which it had been removed in the 1830s. As of 2019, that campaign has not been successful.

Other complaints involved the renaming of Dundee Council's Children and Families' Service to remove the apostrophe, and a temporary road sign in Hartlepool that read "Parking Bay's Suspended".

In 2001, Richards won the satiric Ig Nobel Prize for "his efforts to protect, promote, and defend the differences between plural and possessive".

In December 2019, when Richards was 95, he announced that the society was shutting down, saying that, despite its efforts, "fewer organisations and individuals are now caring about the correct use of the apostrophe".

John Richards died on 30 March 2021, aged 97. A tribute appeared on the legacy Apostrophe Protection Society website.

The ownership of the Apostrophe Protection Society and its website transferred to Bob McCalden on 5 February 2022.

See also
 The "Blog" of "Unnecessary" Quotation Marks

External links

References

2001 establishments in the United Kingdom
Non-profit organisations based in the United Kingdom
Organizations established in 2001
Punctuation of English